Chugh is a surname found among Hindus and Sikhs from the Punjabi Arora Khatri and Sindhi Khatri community. Notable people with the surname include:

Dinesh Chugh, producer of the film Mittal v/s Mittal
Professor Kirpal Singh Chugh (1932–2017), Indian nephrologist
Bhai Vir Singh Chugh (1882–1957), Indian poet

References

Indian surnames
Punjabi-language surnames
Arora clans
Surnames of Indian origin
Hindu surnames
Khatri clans
Khatri surnames